The 2009–10 season was the 14th edition of Europe's premier basketball tournament for women - EuroLeague Women
since it was rebranded to its current format

Regular season

Group A

Group B

Group C

Group D

Knockout stage

Eight-finals

Quarter-finals

Final four

Individual leaders 

Stats includes postseason games and are sorted on average per game.

Points per game

Offensive rebounds per game

Rebounds per game

Assists per game

Other statistics

Individual game highs

Team leaders 

Stats includes postseason games and are sorted on average per game.

References 
 FIBA Europe
 2009-10 Players Statistical Leaders - Points per game
 200-10 Players Game Highs - Points

 
2009–10